is an underground metro station located in Naka-ku, Nagoya, Aichi Prefecture, Japan, operated by the Nagoya Municipal Subway. It is located 2.3 rail kilometers from the terminus of the Meijō Line at Kanayama Station. This station provides access to several department stores in Sakae such as Parco and Matsuzakaya.

History
Yabachō Station was opened on 30 March 1967. It is named after the historic neighbourhood of Yaba-chō.

At the entrance to the turnstiles, a mechanical water clock by the French scientist Bernard Gitton was installed in the 1990s.

Lines

 (Station number: M04)

Layout
Yabacho Station has two underground opposed side platforms.

Platforms

References

External links

 Official web page 

Railway stations in Japan opened in 1967
Railway stations in Aichi Prefecture
Sakae, Nagoya